His Lordship Regrets is a 1938 British comedy film directed by Maclean Rogers and starring Claude Hulbert, Winifred Shotter, Gina Malo and Aubrey Mallalieu. Impoverished Lord Cavender pursues wealthy Mabel van Morgan only to discover himself in love with the apparently penniless Mary.

Cast

Critical reception
TV Guide called it a "Blah comedy," and went on to conclude that a "Decent cast of familiar British faces doesn't help this one."

References

External links

1938 films
1938 comedy films
British comedy films
Films directed by Maclean Rogers
British black-and-white films
1930s English-language films
1930s British films